Qatar participates in the 2021 Islamic Solidarity Games held in Konya, Turkey from 9 to 18 August 2022, the Games were rescheduled from 20 to 29 August 2021, the event was postponed to be held from 10 to 19 September 2021 in July 2020 by the ISSF because the original dates were coinciding with the 2020 Summer Olympics, which were postponed due to the COVID-19 pandemic. In May 2021, the ISSF postponed the event to August 2022 citing the COVID-19 pandemic situation in the participating countries.

Medalists

Athletics 

Track & road events

Basketball

Men's 3x3 tournament
Group A

Women's 3x3 tournament
Group A

Quarterfinal

Handball

Men's tournament
Group A

Semifinal

Gold medal game

Volleyball

Men's tournament
Pool B

|}

Wrestling 

Men's Greco-Roman

References

Nations at the 2021 Islamic Solidarity Games
2021
Islamic Solidarity Games